Club Deportivo Quevedo is an Ecuadorian professional football club based in Quevedo. They currently play in the Ecuadorian Serie B, the country's second division-flight professional league.

Current squad

Managers
 Raúl Duarte (Jan 1, 2012 – July 22, 2013)
 Juan Urquiza (July 22, 2013 – Sept 25, 2013)
 José Mora (Sept 25, 2013–)

References

External links

 
Football clubs in Ecuador
1952 establishments in Ecuador
Association football clubs established in 1952